Frederick George Bluett (January 20, 1876, Middlesex, London – December 3, 1942, Double Bay, New South Wales) was a London-born vaudevillian and radio actor.

Biography
He was the son of comedian and stage actor Frederick William Bluett, and his grandfather had also been a stage performer. Fred came to Australia as a fifteen year old in 1891 and remained in the region for the rest of his life. Not long after arriving in Australia Bluett left for New Zealand, spending almost a decade working for the Fullers on their Dominion circuit. He returned to Australia in 1902 under contract to Harry Rickards and over the next three decades cemented his reputation as one of the region's premier comedians. 

Bluett's children Augustus Frederick "Gus" Bluett (born 23 April 1902, Prahran, Victoria  – 14 March 1936) and radio performer Kitty (born 1916), to dressmaker wife Catherine McKechnie, whom he married in April 1901, also became well-known comedians in their own right. His other daughter was Belle (born 1909).

Bluett died of coronary vascular disease on 3 December 1942.

Selected credits
An Interrupted Divorce (1916) - short film
Showgirl's Luck (1931) - film
Cinesound Varieties (1934) - film

References

External links
Fred Bluett at Australian Dictionary of Biography

Fred Bluett Biography at Australian Variety Theatre Archive

Australian male radio actors
1942 deaths
1876 births
Male actors from London
English emigrants to colonial Australia